The 2018 Midwestern Intercollegiate Volleyball Association Tournament is the men's volleyball tournament for the Midwestern Intercollegiate Volleyball Association during the 2018 NCAA Division I & II men's volleyball season. It is being held  April 14 through April 21, 2018 at campus sites. The winner receives the Association's automatic bid to the 2018 NCAA Volleyball Tournament.

Seeds
All eight teams are eligible for the postseason, with the highest seed hosting each round. Teams were seeded by record within the conference, with a tiebreaker system to seed teams with identical conference records.

Schedule and results

Bracket

References

Volleyball competitions in the United States
2018 Midwestern Intercollegiate Volleyball Association season
2018 NCAA Division I & II men's volleyball season